The South Australian Gazette And Colonial Register was the name of two different publications in early South Australia. Both later changed their name.
 South Australian Gazette And Colonial Register (1836–1839) later became the South Australian Register
 South Australian Gazette And Colonial Register (1845–1847) became the South Australian Gazette and Mining Journal